PSPP stands for Persatuan Sepakbola Padang Panjang (en: Football Association of Padang Panjang). PSPP Padang Panjang is an  Indonesian football club based in Padang Panjang, West Sumatra. Club played in Liga 3.

References

External links
Liga-Indonesia.co.id

Football clubs in Indonesia
Football clubs in West Sumatra